Piano Sonata No. 17 may refer to: 
Piano Sonata No. 17 (Beethoven)
Piano Sonata No. 17 (Mozart)